Stephanie Cadieux (born 1972 or 1973) is a Canadian politician, who was elected as a BC Liberal member of the Legislative Assembly of British Columbia in the 2009 provincial election, representing the riding of Surrey-Panorama. After the 2013 provincial election, Cadieux was elected in the riding of Surrey-Cloverdale and in the 2017 provincial election, Cadieux was elected in the riding of Surrey South. She is currently Opposition critic for Advanced Education, having previously served, when her party formed the government, as the Minister of Children and Family Development, and prior to that as Minister of Social Development, Minister of Labour, Citizens' Services and Open Government and Minister of Community, Sport and Cultural Development.

She was a member of the Select Standing Committees on Health and on Children and Youth, and a former member of the Special Committee to Review the Freedom of Information and Protection of Privacy Act.

Cadieux, formerly the director of marketing and development for the BC Paraplegic Association and manager of accessibility for 2010 Legacies Now Society. Her leadership and resourcefulness led her to be voted one of Business in Vancouver's Top 40 Under 40 for 2007. She has been a wheelchair user since a car accident at age 18. She is the second wheelchair user, following Doug Mowat, elected to the provincial legislature.

She has served as president of the Realwheels Society, ambassador for the Rick Hansen Man in Motion Foundation, a researcher and member of the advisory panel for the International Collaboration on Repair Discoveries (ICORD), a member of the Diversity Advisory Committee for Global BC and as a mentor with the YWCA.

She has traveled extensively, including to Europe, Central America, Africa and North America, some of which has been as a delegate for international development work with people with disabilities in developing countries.

She resigned from her MLA position, effective April 30, 2022, to become Canada's first Chief Accessibility Officer.

Electoral results

References

External links
 Stephanie Cadieux, MLA for Surrey-Panorama
 MLA Profile

British Columbia Liberal Party MLAs
Year of birth missing (living people)
Living people
Politicians with paraplegia
People from Surrey, British Columbia
Canadian politicians with disabilities
Women government ministers of Canada
Members of the Executive Council of British Columbia
Women MLAs in British Columbia
21st-century Canadian politicians
21st-century Canadian women politicians